Derek Anthony Swan (born 24 October 1966) is an Irish former footballer who played as a forward. He played for Home Farm, Bohemians, Port Vale, FC Wageningen, Shamrock Rovers, Dundalk, Glentoran and UCD.

Club career
Swan began his career with Home Farm in 1985–86, making his debut against Shamrock Rovers in November 1985. The following season he secured a switch to Bohemians, where he averaged ten league goals a year in four years with the club. In June 1987 he guested for Shamrock Rovers in a tournament in South Korea.

He moved to England with Port Vale in May 1990 for a £15,000 fee. Three months later he went out on a one-month loan to FC Wageningen. He never made the first team at Vale Park and was sold on to Shamrock Rovers for £12,500 in November 1990. He scored twice on his Rovers league debut in December 1990. During his three years at the club he scored 25 goals in 75 league appearances and was top club goalscorer in 1991–92 and 1992–93.

In December 1994 he returned to "Bohs" for £2,000 and spent the next six years at Dalymount, including scoring at Helsingin Jalkapalloklubi in a 1995 UEFA Intertoto Cup tie. He also netted in a 1996–97 UEFA Cup tie against FC Dinamo Minsk.

In 2000, he signed for University College Dublin, where his goals helped UCD to avoid relegation as they secured their top flight status for the following 2001-02 season, with one point to spare.

International career
Swan was capped at schoolboy, youth, under-21 and under-23 level for the Republic of Ireland. He also played for the League of Ireland XI against Al-Ahly.

He played at the 1985 FIFA World Youth Championship.

Personal life
His father playeda s a goalkeeper for Bohemians, as well as Drogheda and Athlone. His uncle, Maurice Swan, was also a goalkeeper. His cousin, former defender Tony McDonnell, had a 13-year career with UCD. His son, Ryan, is also a footballer; both father and son have played for Bohemian.

References

Association footballers from County Dublin
Republic of Ireland association footballers
Republic of Ireland under-21 international footballers
Republic of Ireland under-23 international footballers
Republic of Ireland youth international footballers
Association football forwards
Belvedere F.C. players
Home Farm F.C. players
Bohemian F.C. players
Republic of Ireland expatriate association footballers
Expatriate footballers in England
Port Vale F.C. players
Expatriate footballers in the Netherlands
FC Wageningen players
Shamrock Rovers F.C. players
Dundalk F.C. players
Glentoran F.C. players
University College Dublin A.F.C. players
NIFL Premiership players
League of Ireland players
English Football League players
League of Ireland XI players
1966 births
Living people